Zastron is a small agricultural town in the Free State province of South Africa, some 30 km from the border of Lesotho. It is situated at the foot of Aasvoëlberg (Vulture Mountain), named for the rare Cape vultures attracted by a feeding project a short distance out of town. A curious rock formation in the mountain, Die Oog (The Eye), has been adopted as the town's unofficial emblem.

The town was founded in 1876 on the farm Verliesfontein, and named after the maiden name of President Brand's wife, Johanna Sibella Brand, née Zastron.

Notable people
 

David Rabin (1934-1984), university endocrinology professor
Steyn von Rönge (*1955), farmer, politician and President of the Afrikaner Weerstandsbeweging (AWB)

Notes

External links 
 https://web.archive.org/web/20091213045952/http://www.zastron.co.za:80/

Populated places in the Mohokare Local Municipality
Populated places established in 1875